Kurt Calleja (born 5 May 1989) is a Maltese singer. He represented Malta in the Eurovision Song Contest 2012 in Baku, Azerbaijan with the song "This Is the Night". 

The song qualified from the second semi-final into the Eurovision final, where it finished 21st.

Discography

Singles
2010 – "Waterfall" (with Priscilla Psaila)
2011 – "Over and Over"
2012 – "This Is the Night"
2012 – "Boomerang"
2013 – "Leap Of Faith"
2013 – "Love on Mars"

References 

1989 births
Living people
21st-century Maltese male singers
21st-century Maltese singers
Eurovision Song Contest entrants of 2012
Eurovision Song Contest entrants for Malta